The Guarita State Park, officially the Parque Estadual José Lutzenberger, is a state park in the state of Rio Grande do Sul, Brazil. It protects a promontory on the South Atlantic Ocean.

Location

The Guarita State Park is in the municipality of Torres, Rio Grande do Sul, on top of the Torres promontory, the only place in the state where the mountains come down to the sea.

The town of Torres is named after the "towers", or cliffs of volcanic origin, along the sea shore.
There are three large rock formations: the Morro do Farol to the north, then the Morro das Furnas and the Morro da Guarita.
The last two are in the state park.
The rock formations are between 200 and 180 million years old, formed before South America split from Africa, and corresponding to Entedeka in Namibia. The lower layer is rosy sandstone of the Botucatu formation and the upper part is basalt blocks of the Serra Geral Formation.

History

The Guarita State Park  was created in 1971 to protect a geological formation of great scenic and environmental value.
It is also important economically, since it receives about 30,000 visitors annually.
At first the park was administered by the state agency SETUR/RS.
From 1996 it has been administered by the Municipal Secretariat for the Environment and Urbanism through a concession of use.
The change in name to Parque Estadual José Lutzenberger was approved in January 2003, in recognition of the effort made by the environmentalist José Lutzenberger to have the park created, and to define and design the park.

Notes

Sources

State parks of Brazil
Protected areas established in 1971
1971 establishments in Brazil
Protected areas of Rio Grande do Sul